Fantasia (Chinese: 鬼馬狂想曲) is a 2004 Hong Kong comedy film produced, written and directed by Wai Ka-fai and starring Cecilia Cheung, Sean Lau, Louis Koo, Jordan Chan, Francis Ng and Christy Chung. The film is a homage to classic Hong Kong comedy films which starred the Hui Brothers, Michael Hui, Samuel Hui and Ricky Hui, particularly the 1976 film, The Private Eyes.

Plot
In 1969 Hong Kong, private detective agency director Man (Sean Lau) and his two employees, Sam (Louis Koo) and Fugu (Jordan Chan), are investigating an adultery case, where they track their target and crashing into an antique shop, where they end up causing a lot of damage there. Man, who is greedy and miserly, forces Sam and Fugu to be held responsible for the damages, while Sam pushes all responsibility solely on Fugu. In the pile of debris, Fugu finds a lamp which was unable to turn on. At the same time, Fugu also receives a call from his aunt informing him that her cousin, Jane Lam (Christy Chung), who is a student of Stanford University studying Aerospace Technology, have gone mad due to over-studying, and is now missing. Fugu is worried to ask Man for a leave of absence. Man and Sam both took a look at the lamp, which was still unable to turn on, where Man throws the lamp out the window. At this point a sorceress named Harmy Bobo (portrayed by Cecilia Cheung, the character's name is a parody of Harry Potter) magically emerges from the lamp. Bobo arrives at Man's agency and asks the trio to each make a wish, so she can return to her world. Man and Sam both thinks Bobo is Fugu's cousin. However, as Bobo fails in her spells, the trio do not believe her to be sorceress, but she continues to help them in secret. One time in a mahjong game, Bobo's failed spells causes Man to be exposed from his cheating, and thus, he forges a rivalry with gang boss Kin (Francis Ng). Bobo's cousins, the Chopstick Sisters (Charlene Choi, Gillian Chung), also happen to be at the hands of Kin, who took them as his goddaughters.

Cast

Cecilia Cheung as Harmy Bobo
Sean Lau as Director Man
Louis Koo as Sam
Jordan Chan as Fugu
Francis Ng as Kin
Christy Chung as Jane Lam
Charlene Choi as Chopstick Sister (special appearance)
Gillian Chung as Chopstick Sister (special appearance)
Max Chan as Lotus gangster
Ronnie Cheung as Lotus gangster
Marco Lok as Lotus gangster
Johnny Lu as Lotus gangster
Eric Kot as Mun, street cleaner
Chui Tien-you as Black suit thief
Wong You-nam as Black suit thief
Tats Lau as Chicken thief
Steven Cheung as Hogwarts School operator
Kenny Kwan as Hogwarts School operator
Edmond So as Mr. Cheung
Winnie Lau as Mrs. Cheung
May Law as Collegiate quiz show host
Cheung Tat-ming as 2020 spaceman
Lam Sheung Yee as TV commentator
Tommy Wai as Fresh Cream band member 
Wong Wo-hing as Fresh Cream band member
Ho Ka-kit as Fresh Cream band member
Ho Ka-ho as Fresh Cream band member
Michael Hui as Grand Wizard

Reception

Critical response
Andrew Saroch of Far East Films gave the film a score four out of five stars praising the performance by the cast and calls the film "a comedy with so much energy and buoyant spirit." Love HK Film  also praised the performance by the cast and director Wai Ka-fai's care for referencing defining characteristics of classic Cantonese films but notes how audiences who do not get the referential jokes would not enjoy the film. HK Film Net gave the film a positive review referring the film as "entertaining" and "smart", and calls it "an outstanding comedy".

Box office
The film grossed HK$25,093,425 at the Hong Kong box office during its theatrical run.

References

External links

Fantasia at Hong Kong Cinemagic

2004 films
2000s fantasy comedy films
Hong Kong fantasy comedy films
Hong Kong slapstick comedy films
2000s parody films
Hong Kong detective films
2000s Cantonese-language films
China Star Entertainment Group films
Films directed by Wai Ka-Fai
Films set in 1969
Films set in Hong Kong
Films shot in Hong Kong
Films with screenplays by Wai Ka-fai
2004 comedy films
2000s Hong Kong films